The India women's national sevens rugby union team is India's national representative in Rugby sevens. They played their first international sevens rugby at the 2010 Asian Games in Guangzhou, China, where they finished seventh. India competed at the 2019 Asia Rugby Women's Sevens Series in the Trophy division and placed second overall.

Sevens was first played in India in 1886 at the Khajjiar Gymkhana.

Players

Previous squad

Sitara Indramohan
V. Boman Bharucha
Niharika Bal
Bhagyalaxmi Barik
Neha Pardeshi
Surabhi Date
Tapasi Nandi
Sutapa Das
Kalpana Das
Sheetal Maurya
Annapurna Bothate
Yogita Marathe

Tournament History

Asian Games

References

Asian national women's rugby union teams
Women's national rugby sevens teams

R